An Urban Improvement Trust is a type of statutory body in the state of Rajasthan, India, constituted for the purpose of promoting urban development. The power to create Urban Improvement Trusts was provided by the Rajasthan Urban Improvement Act, 1959.

References

Government of Rajasthan
Urban planning in India